Sumit Suri is a Bollywood Actor and Producer born on 14th Dec and brought up in Rishikesh. After acted in about 30-40 TV commercials, he made his debut in feature films as one of the leads in Eros International Gurmmeet Singh (Mirzapur fame) directed Warning (2013 film). Later seen in films as one of the leads in Viacom18's What the Fish, Babloo Happy Hai directed by Nila Madhab Panda, Surkhaab and A Billion Colour Story.
He played a Sikh Special Force Officer in The Test Case web series for ALT Balaji.
His last project was Zee Studios Feature Film 14 Phere, He played the main antagonist in the film. 

Sumit Suri started his Production House "Good Hands Films" based in Mumbai in 2019 specialising in TV Commercials, Digital & Corporate Films, Brand Videos and Print Campaigns.

Filmography

Web series

Television

References

External links 

 

Male actors in Hindi cinema
Living people
Male actors from Mumbai
1986 births